Austroablepharus is a genus of skinks endemic to Australia.

Species
Three species are recognized.

Austroablepharus barrylyoni Couper et al., 2010 – Lyon's snake-eyed skink
Austroablepharus kinghorni (Copland, 1947) – red-tailed soil-crevice skink
Austroablepharus naranjicauda Greer, Fisher & Horner, 2004 – orange-tailed snake-eyed skink

References

 
Lizard genera
Skinks of Australia